
Great St Bernard Lake is a mountain lake of the Pennine Alps, located south-west of Great St Bernard Pass. It is divided between Switzerland (canton of Valais) and Italy (region of Aosta Valley), although it lies south of the Alps, within the Dora Baltea basin.

The lake is located at a height of 2,447 metres above sea level and has a maximum length of 350 metres.

References

Swisstopo topographic maps

Lakes of Valais
Lakes of Aosta Valley
Italy–Switzerland border
International lakes of Europe